The Denmark Mound Group or Denmark Site (40MD85) is a Mississippian culture archaeological site on a low bluff overlooking Big Black Creek, a tributary of the Hatchie River near Denmark in Madison County, Tennessee. The site features include a village with over 70 structures, 2 rectangular platform mounds and a small conical burial mound as well as possible evidence of a surrounding palisade. The site was added to the NRHP in 1992.

See also
 Annis Mound
 Chucalissa
 Obion Mounds

References

External links

Middle Mississippian culture
Archaeological sites in Tennessee
Archaeological sites on the National Register of Historic Places in Tennessee
Madison County, Tennessee
National Register of Historic Places in Madison County, Tennessee